Chandrika de Silva (Sinhalese: චන්ද්‍රිකා ද සිල්වා; Tamils: சந்திரிகா த சில்வா; born 24 February 1974) also known as Renu Chandrika Hettiarachchige is a Sri Lankan badminton player. She represented her country at the 2002, 2006 and 2010 Commonwealth Games.

Career 
She won the Sri Lanka national championships in 1997 to 2003 and regained the title back in 2005. In 2004, she won one silver and three bronze medals at the 2004 South Asian Games. At the 2005 Nepal Satellite she clinched the women's singles and mixed doubles event, and at the same year, she reached the women's doubles quarterfinals at the Asian Championships. She also won the women's and mixed doubles titles in Syria and Jordan.

Achievements

South Asian Games 
Women's singles

Women's doubles

Mixed doubles

BWF International Challenge/Series (7 titles, 7 runners-up) 
Women's singles

Women's doubles

Mixed doubles

  BWF International Challenge tournament
  BWF International Series tournament
  BWF Future Series tournament

References

External links 
 

1974 births
Living people
Sri Lankan female badminton players
Badminton players at the 1998 Asian Games
Asian Games competitors for Sri Lanka
Badminton players at the 2002 Commonwealth Games
Badminton players at the 2006 Commonwealth Games
Badminton players at the 2010 Commonwealth Games
Commonwealth Games competitors for Sri Lanka
South Asian Games silver medalists for Sri Lanka
South Asian Games bronze medalists for Sri Lanka
South Asian Games medalists in badminton